P. longifolia may refer to:
 Persoonia longifolia,  the long-leaf persoonia or snottygobble, a small tree species found in Western Australia
 Physalis longifolia, the common groundcherry, a plant species native to North America
 Pinguicula longifolia, the long-leaved butterwort, a perennial carnivorous sub-alpine plant species found in the Central Pyrenees
 Potentilla longifolia, a plant species found in Russia and Mongolia
 Pulmonaria longifolia, the narrow-leaved lungwort, a plant species native to western Europe